At the Edge of the Great City is a 1922 German silent film directed by Hanns Kobe and starring Evi Eva, Fritz Kortner and Rudolf Forster.

The film's sets were designed by the art director Robert A. Dietrich.

Cast

References

Bibliography

External links

1922 films
Films of the Weimar Republic
German silent feature films
German black-and-white films
Films directed by Hanns Kobe
Films based on German novels